Moviecam Compact is a movie camera product line created by Moviecam in 1990. It was developed by Fritz Gabriel Bauer as an improvement on his Moviecam SuperAmerica.

Description
Its potential applications are widespread, and it is regularly used on music videos, for commercials, in second unit work on features, for special effects shooting, and for motion control. It became the most popular 35 mm movie camera in general use because of its intuitive design, wide range of applications, high reliability and retail availability. In recognition of the Compact system's achievements, AMPAS awarded Moviecam a Scientific and Engineering Academy Award in 1993.

In 2004, Moviecam released the Compact MK2, with an updated drive system to improve longevity.

The Compact was used to film the horror movies Vampire in Brooklyn and Scream, directed by Wes Craven. The Compact MK2 was used to shoot The Ward, photographed by Yaron Orbach and directed by John Carpenter.

The Arricam systems, co-developed by Arri and Bauer, were inspired by the Compact and Arriflex 535 series in their design and mechanisms.

See also
 Moviecam
 Moviecam SL – lighter version of Moviecam Compact series.

References

External links
Moviecam Compact
Moviecam Compact MK2
Included description of Moviecam Compact in Cinematographer.nl

Movie cameras